Mtanila is an administrative ward on the Chunya District of the Mbeya Region of Tanzania. In 2016 the Tanzania National Bureau of Statistics report there were 9,601 people in the ward, from 8,711 in 2012.

Villages / vitongoji 
The ward has 3 villages and 19 vitongoji.

 Mtanila
 Igama
 Ikokotela
 Kawisunge
 Manolo
 Mapimbi
 Mtanila C.
 Nkena
 Igangwe
 Igangwe
 Lupuju
 Masimba
 Shauri Moyo
 Sokoine
 Kalangali
 Ilolo
 Ilumwa
 Itigi
 Kasasya
 Konde
 Majengo
 Ndola

References 

Wards of Mbeya Region